Boubanzegue is a village in the Lobaye region in the Central African Republic southwest of the capital, Bangui.

Nearby towns and villages include Ndimbi (2.0 nm), Botoko (1.0 nm), Mboma (1.4 nm).

Populated places in Lobaye